The ashy flycatcher (Muscicapa caerulescens) is a species of bird in the Old World flycatcher family Muscicapidae. It is found throughout sub-Saharan Africa, excluding the drier areas of South Africa, Botswana, and Namibia, where it inhabits subtropical or tropical dry forest, subtropical or tropical moist lowland forest, and savanna. It has a disputed generic placement, with different authorities variously putting it in Muscicapa, Fraseria, or other genera. The species does not display sexual dimorphism, with both sexes being grey in colour with pale grey or white .

The species has a small, thin, and pointed beak adapted for eating insects. Its diet is mostly insectivorous, although it also eats berries and small geckoes. The birds are very active, foraging singly, in groups, or in mixed-species flocks. They forage in the upper levels of the canopy, with prey being caught with small circular flights, from foliage, and being gleaned from the bark and leaves. The species breeds in solitary pairs, with each pair maintaining a territory of 1–4 hectare and raising young alone. A variety of vocalisations are used by the species, and there is very little geographical variation in calls.

Taxonomy and systematics 
The ashy flycatcher was originally described as Butalis caerulescens by the German ornithologist Gustav Hartlaub in 1865, based on specimens from South Africa. The name of the genus, Muscicapa, is derived from the Latin words musca, meaning a fly, and capere, meaning "to catch". The specific name of the species refers to its colour, meaning dark blue or cerulean in Latin. Ashy flycatcher is the official common name designated by the International Ornithologists' Union (IOU). Other common names for the species include ashy alseonax, blue-grey flycatcher, bluegrey flycatcher, blue-grey alseonax, little blue flycatcher, and white-eyed flycatcher.

The ashy flycatcher was long placed in the genus Muscicapa, but a 2016 study of DNA sequences of Muscicapa flycatchers by Gary Voelker and colleagues found that the genus was paraphyletic. The same study found that the ashy flycatcher was most likely sister to Tessmann's flycatcher, and that these two species were most closely related to the olivaceous flycatcher. , the ashy flycatcher's current generic placement is disputed. The IOU continues to place it in the genus Muscicapa, while The Clements Checklist places it in Fraseria along with Tessmann's flycatcher. The authors of the 2016 study suggested placing both of these species in either Cichlomyia or Butalis, depending on which one has priority.

Subspecies 
There are six recognised subspecies:

 M. c. caerulescens (Hartlaub, 1865): The nominate subspecies, it is found in Mozambique, South Africa and Eswatini.

 M. c. brevicauda Ogilvie-Grant, 1907: Found from northern Benin and southern Nigeria to South Sudan, western Kenya, southern Democratic Republic of the Congo (DRC) and northwestern Angola. It is generally darker than the nominate and has slate-grey  with grey .

 M. c. nigrorum (Collin & Hartert, 1927): Found from Guinea to Togo. It is slightly paler than brevicauda, with mouse-grey upperparts and more uniformly grey underparts.

 M. c. cinereola Hartlaub & Finsch, 1870: Found in Somalia, Kenya and Tanzania. It is intermediate in appearance between brevicauda and impavida.

 M. c. vulturna Clancey, 1957: Found from Malawi and Mozambique to northern South Africa and Eswatini. It is paler than the nominate, with the throat and belly being purer white.

 M. c. impavida Clancey, 1957: Found from Angola east to the DRC, Tanzania, and Mozambique and south to Namibia, Botswana, and Zimbabwe. It is even paler than vulturna, with the upperparts being ashier and less blue in color and the underparts being more uniformly white.

Description 
They have black loral lines with white stripes above, along with pale, well-defined eye-rings.

Vocalisations 
The ashy flycatcher is a widespread species, but very little variation in vocalisations has been observed through its range. It has a varied repertoire of call types and many different calls. The dawn song consists of 5–7 notes that typically start at a high pitch before going down and then up again. Phrases typically repeat every 3–5 phrases. It is given at dawn in complete darkness for at least 30 minutes from a high canopy level on a fixed perch. After sunrise, birds switch from the dawn song to the day song, which consists of 3–8 short staccato notes. Other songs include the warbling song.

Ashy flycatchers also have a variety of calls, including short peeps and chirps, a high-pitched wheeze, and other notes. A piercing, slightly descending hiss is used as an alarm, often uttered to warn of approaching predators. It is very similar to the alarm calls of other species of birds and is an interspecific call. A distress call, consisting of a shrill, high-pitched, and buzzing note, is given when birds are in panic or stressed. Males also snap wings and bill when observers approach their offspring. Chicks give a high-pitched begging call, which has also been described as a "shrill, short, rattling squeak".

Behaviour and ecology 

It is a restless and active bird that is constantly moving and shifting. It has been observed sunbathing on the ground.

Diet 
The ashy flycatcher forages singly, in pairs, or in groups of up to seven individuals. It is also known to sometimes join  mixed-species flocks while foraging. Foraging is typically done in the upper levels of vegetation, between the treetops and the undercanopy. Ashy flycatchers typically sit upright on exposed perches. Food is caught by making short circular flights to catch flying insects or hovering to catch prey in foliage. It also gleans insects from foliage and bark.

Its diet consists of mostly insects, mainly beetles, flies, grasshoppers, adult and larval moths and butterflies, winged ants, and termites. Prey tend to be  in size, with the majority being  in size.

Breeding 
The ashy flycatcher is mainly breeds from September–January, with the exact observed breeding period varying throughout its range; it has also been observed breeding from February–June in the DRC, and in February, May, June, and August in East Africa. Pairs are monogamous, solitary, and territorial, maintaining areas of up to 20 hectare in the non-breeding seasons and territories of 1–4 ha during the breeding season. They are built by both sexes and consist of a sturdy "cup" made of moss, grass, rootlets, shredded bark, fibers, and spiderwebs. Birds have been recorded building over old nests and inhabiting old weaver bird nests. After hatching, young are fed by both parents.

Distribution and habitat 

The ashy flycatcher is found through most of sub-Saharan Africa, from southern Cameroon east through Uganda to southern Kenya and Somalia, and south to Angola, northern Namibia and Botswana, and western South Africa. It is absent from the arid regions of Namibia, Botswana, and South Africa, but is found patchily through West Africa, in Sierra Leone, southeastern Guinea, Liberia, Côte d'Ivoire, southern Ghana, southwestern Togo, extreme southern Benin, Burkina Faso, and southern Nigeria.

The species inhabits a variety of forest and woodland. It occurs near forest edges and enters forest only if it has been logged or opened by roads. It is also known to inhabit open gallery forest, secondary growth, riverine strips, and some plantations. It occurs in peanut and cassava fields with scattered tall trees and borders of shrubs or bushes, along with miombo woodland, dense woodland thickets, open riverine woodland, and thornveld and thorn-scrub.

Status 
The ashy flycatcher was listed as being of least concern by the International Union for Conservation of Nature (IUCN) on the IUCN Red List due to its large range, stable population, and occurrence in a number of protected areas. The population in Mozambique is estimated to number over 5,000 individuals.

References

External links
Image at ADW
 Ashy flycatcher - Species text in The Atlas of Southern African Birds.

ashy flycatcher
Birds of Sub-Saharan Africa
ashy flycatcher
Taxonomy articles created by Polbot
Taxobox binomials not recognized by IUCN